Danny Herrera (July 29, 1937 – April 25, 2008) was an American powerlifter from East Los Angeles, California.

Biography 

Herrera started lifting weights at fifteen years old and continued working out intermittently through his adult life.

Background

Herrera graduated in 1956 from Garfield High School in East Los Angeles.  He then studied Industrial Arts at Humboldt State College in Arcata, California, graduating with a BA in 1962.  Since 1962 he worked as an educator in Los Angeles area high schools.

Records - Masters (65-69 years old), 275 lb class
Amateur Athletic Union, World Fullpower Powerlifting Championship (Richmond, VA) October 2002
Squat- 507 lb.
Bench- 424 lb.
Dead Lift- 485 lb.

Amateur Athletic Union, World Bench Championship (Laughlin, NV) December 2002 - 440 lb.

United States Powerlifting Federation, West Coast Championship (Venice, CA) September 2003
Squat- 540 lb.
Bench- 418 lb.
Dead Lift- 502 lb.

USA PowerLifting, California State Championship (Napa, CA) October 2003
Bench- 418 lb.

United States Powerlifting Federation, Venice Beach Classic (Venice, CA) September 2005
Bench- 425 lb.

World Association of Benchers and Deadlifters, World Bench Championship (Reno, NV) November 2005
Bench-418 lb.

References 

1937 births
American powerlifters
American sportspeople of Mexican descent
2008 deaths